Michal na Ostrove is a village and municipality in the Dunajská Streda District in the Trnava Region of south-west Slovakia.

Geography
The municipality lies at an altitude of 118 metres and covers an area of 10.653 km².

History

In the 9th century, the territory of Michal na Ostrove was part of Great Moravia. After Hungarian invasion, it became part of the Kingdom of Hungary. The village was first recorded in 1337 by its Hungarian name as Weke.

Until the end of World War I, it was part of Hungary and fell within the Dunaszerdahely district of Pozsony County. After the Austro-Hungarian army defeat and disintegration in November 1918, victory western powers established Czechoslovak administration, as part of cease-fire agreements. After official peaceful agreement of Hungary with USA, Britain and France, the Treaty of Trianon of 1920, the village became officially part of democratic Czechoslovakia. Hungarians agreed to full independence of Czechoslovakia and their borders. However, in November 1938, after agreement with Hitler, Nazi-cooperative Hungary took the area, so called First Vienna Award and this "award" was held by Hungary until 1945. After Soviets defeated German and Hungarian troops in 1945, Czechoslovak administration returned to the village. Following a socialistic coup in 1948, the village became part of socialistic Czechoslovakia until 1989. During 1989–1992 it was part of Czech and Slovak Federative Republic and since 1 January 1993 it is part of the Slovak Republic.

Demography 
In 1910, the village had 480, for the most part, Hungarian inhabitants. At the 2001 Census the recorded population of the village was 419 while an end-2008 estimate by the Statistical Office had the villages's population as 419. As of 2001, 89,03 per cent of its population was Hungarian while 8,16 per cent was Slovak. Roman Catholicism is the majority religion of the village, its adherents numbering 87.48% of the total population.

References

External links
Local news at www.parameter.sk 

Villages and municipalities in Dunajská Streda District
Hungarian communities in Slovakia